Ferencvárosi Torna Club is a Hungarian professional football club based in Ferencváros, Budapest. The club was formed in 1899 and played their first competitive match in the 1901 Nemzeti Bajnokság I.

Key

Nemzeti Bajnokság I
 Pld = Matches played
 W = Matches won
 D = Matches drawn
 L = Matches lost
 GF = Goals for
 GA = Goals against
 Pts = Points
 Pos = Final position

Hungarian football league system
 NBI = Nemzeti Bajnokság I 
 NBII = Nemzeti Bajnokság II 
 NBIII = Nemzeti Bajnokság III 
 MBI = Megyei Bajnokság I 

Magyar Kupa
 F = Final
 SF = Semi-finals
 QF = Quarter-finals
 R16 = Round of 16
 R32 = Round of 32
 R64 = Round of 64
 R128 = Round of 128

UEFA
 F = Final
 SF = Semi-finals
 QF = Quarter-finals
 Group = Group stage
 PO = Play-offs
 QR3 = Third qualifying round
 QR2 = Second qualifying round
 QR1 = First qualifying round
 PR = Preliminary round

Seasons
As of 15 May 2022.

Notes
Note 1: Ferencváros won the Western group of the 1945–46 season by having played 26 matches (22 won, 1 draw, 3 lost) gaining 45 points and was promoted to the best 10 teams where it finished 5th.
Note 2: Ferencváros won the Group B of the 1970 spring season and lost to 4–3 on aggregate against Újpest
Note 3: 2 points deducted.
Note 4: Ferencváros did not receive license from the Hungarian Football Federation governed by István Kisteleki, therefore the club was relegated to the Hungarian League 2.
Note 5: Ferencváros was banned from the Magyar Cup following incidents in 2004–05 Magyar Kupa Final.
Note 6: Csaba Máté as interim coach for two 2013–14 Nemzeti Bajnokság I matches (Ferencváros 1–2 Pécs & Videoton 2–3 Ferencváros) and one 2013–14 Magyar Kupa match (Újpest 1–0 Ferencváros).
Note 7: Ferencváros qualified for the final of the 1940 Mitropa Cup, but it was suspended due to the events of the World War II.

References

Ferencvárosi TC
Ferencvárosi TC seasons
Ferencvárosi